Crystal Boys (孽子, pinyin: Nièzǐ, "sons of sin") is a novel written by author Pai Hsien-yung and first published in 1983 in Taiwan. In 1988, this novel went into circulation in China; its French and English translations were published in 1985 and 1989. A translation into German ("Treffpunkt Lotussee") appeared in 1995.

Nièzǐ means literally "sinful sons" or "sons of sin", but it may also be an allusion to a passage in Mencius in which "friendless officials and concubine's sons" (孤臣孽子) reach positions of power because they have learned to live with a dangerous status.

A movie called Outcasts, based on this novel, was released in 1986. In 2003, the material was adapted by Taiwan Public Television Service Foundation into a miniseries.

There is a reference to You Xian Ku in the chapter "Journey to the Goblin Cave".

Plot summary
The story takes place in Taipei in 1971 (or, in the most recent film adaptation, in 1973), and follows a short period in the life of a young man called Li-Qing (李青, nicknamed A-Qing).

When A-Qing is expelled from his school because of "scandalous relations" with classmate Zhao Ying (趙英), his father kicks him out of the family home. A-Qing begins to hang out at a park called New Park, a gay cruising area and hangout for gay men, where he meets the novel's other primary characters.

Characters 
 A-Qing 阿青: the main character, a strong character both emotionally and physically. 
 Di-wa 弟娃: A-Qing's younger brother.
 Xiao Yu 小玉: A somewhat flamboyant Japanese-Taiwanese. Dreams of going to Japan to find his father.
 Lao Shu (Mouse) 老鼠: A petty thief, a bit sloppy, a little silly. Lives with his abusive older brother in a house of gambling and crime.
 Wu Min 吴敏: Like A-Qing, was kicked from his home by his father. While physically strong, he is emotionally weak, attempting suicide after his lover breaks up with him.
 Master Yang, Shi Fu 師傅: Pimp of the above-mentioned characters, he helps give them jobs and protection, later opening a gay bar.
 Lao Guo 老郭: A retired photographer, who keeps a photo book of the various characters who flock to the park. First one to take A-Qing in.
 Long Zi (Dragon) 王夔龙， 龍子: Returns to Taipei after living in USA, where he went after murdering his lover A-Feng in a fit of rage. Their story has become legendary in the park.
 A-Feng (Phoenix) 阿鳳: The wild son of a mute woman, grew up an orphan. Was Long Zi's lover, but was killed by him.

The story focuses on A-Qing's struggle between himself, his family, and a society where homosexuality is taboo.

Translations  
An English translation of the novel by Howard Goldblatt, titled Crystal Boys, was published in 1990 by Gay Sunshine Press.

TV series 
The TV series Crystal Boys  stars:
Fan Chi-wei (范植偉 as A-Qing)
Tony Yang (楊佑寧 as Zhao Ying)
Joseph Chang (張孝全 as Wu Min 吳敏)
Wu Huai Zhong (吴怀中 as Lao Shu 老鼠)

See also
 List of television shows with gay characters
Queer culture
Homosexuality in China

References

External links 
Official Website (in Chinese)

1983 novels
Novels by Pai Hsien-yung
Taiwanese LGBT-related television shows
Taiwanese drama television series
Fiction set in the 1960s
1980s LGBT novels